Radio Wayne is the second studio album by actor and comedian Wayne Brady. It is also his first full-length children's music album, his second Disney-labeled album after his recording of "The Tiki Tiki Tiki Room" for the Disney Music Block Party (2008) compilation, and his third children's album appearance after Marlo Thomas & Friends: Thanks & Giving All Year Long and Disney Music Block Party. The album's title was inspired by the radio network Radio Disney.

Reception

Common Sense Media gave the album 4/5 stars and said the "album teaches kids all about manners, good behavior, hygiene, and eating vegetables, but in a way that's so fun and danceable that kids may not even realize that they're learning".

Track listing

References

External links
Official website at Disney Music

2011 albums
Wayne Brady albums
Walt Disney Records albums